Trahimam  is an upcoming Indian Hindi-language drama film directed by Dushyant Pratap Singh. The film stars Arshi Khan, Pankaj Berry, Mushtaq Khan and Adi Irani. The trailer of the film was released on November 1, 2022.

Cast 
 Arshi Khan
 Pankaj Berry
 Adi Irani
 Mushtaq Khan
 Raju Kher
 Ekta Jain

Plot
The film revolves around village girl named Champa, played by Arshi Khan. It is shown in the movie how she was raped and political powers escape rapist and all the criminals.

Soundtrack 

The Music and background score were composed by Piyush Ranjan and the lyrics were penned by Manish Muradiya.

Filming
The film is mostly shot in Mumbai, Maharashtra, Agra, Uttar Pradesh and mainly in Rajasthan.

References

External links 
 
 

2022 films
Indian drama films
2020s Hindi-language films